Railway Labor Executives' Association v. Gibbons, 455 U.S. 457 (1982), was a U.S. Supreme Court case that affirmed distinction between the Commerce Clause and Bankruptcy Clause of the Enumerated powers, and held that legislation passed by Congress regarding bankruptcy must respect the uniformity requirement by not targeting a specific company.

Background
In March 1975, the Chicago, Rock Island and Pacific Railroad Co. (Rock Island) petitioned for reorganization with the Interstate Commerce Commission (ICC). The reorganization allowed the company to survive for over four years, but a labor strike in September 1979 forced it to cease all operations. The ICC ordered the Kansas City Terminal Railway Co. to provide service over Rock Island's railways.

On January 25, 1980, the reorganization court concluded that reorganization was not possible and directed the Trustee of the organization to begin preparing for liquidation of the company. The liquidation was scheduled to happen in March 1980, immediately concluding the ICC's contract with the Kansas City railway company.

Congress responded to this crisis by passing , the Rock Island Railroad Transition and Employee Assistance Act (RITA), which would have instructed the ICC to liquidate assets and then prioritize compensating labor who lost their jobs because of the bankruptcy, but had not found new employment through liquidation contracts. The amount that Congress believe owed to these employees amounted to $75 million dollars. It was signed into law by President Ronald Reagan on May 30, 1980, three days before the reorganization court's order to abandon the Rock Island railways was to become active.

On June 5, appellees filed a complaint with the reorganization court declaring RITA unconstitutional. The reorganization court issued a preliminary injunction prohibiting its enforcement. The court suggested that RITA violated the Just Compensation Clause of the Fifth Amendment.

Congress again responded to this injunction by invoking Section 701 of the Staggers Rail Act, which re-enacted RITA and added , which stated "any decision of the bankruptcy court with respect to the constitutionality of any provision of this chapter ... shall be taken to the United States Court of Appeals for the Seventh Circuit". The bill was passed on October 14, 1980.

The United States had motioned the reorganization court six days prior to vacate its previous injunction, as the Staggers Act would render it moot. The day after the Staggers Act was passed, the reorganization court denied the motion to vacate. Pursuant to the newly enacted law, appellant and the United States appealed to the Court of Appeals for the Seventh Circuit. The Court of Appeals affirmed the reorganization court's decision with an even split. Appellant then petitioned the Supreme Court.

Decision
The Supreme Court was unanimous in its decision that RITA, as amended by the Staggers Act, was "repugnant" to the Bankruptcy Clause which required bankruptcy laws to apply "uniformly".

The majority's opinion elaborated that the court first had to determine if Congress was invoking the Bankruptcy Clause or the Commerce Clause. The majority opinion was delivered by Justice Rehnquist, who claimed determining what power Congress was exercising was "admittedly not an easy task". However, they decided it was inappropriately using the powers of the Bankruptcy Clause, evidenced by the timing of the legislation and that sections explicitly directed the bankruptcy court on how to prioritize distribution of funds.

Although the original decision was made because of the Just Compensation Clause of the Fifth Amendment, the Supreme Court did not reach on this, as the issue with the Bankruptcy Clause was sufficient to declare RITA unconstitutional.

See also
 Skinner v. Railway Labor Executives Ass'n (1989)
 List of United States Supreme Court cases, volume 455
 List of United States Supreme Court cases
 Lists of United States Supreme Court cases by volume
 List of United States Supreme Court cases by the Rehnquist Court

References

External links
 

United States bankruptcy case law
United States Supreme Court cases
United States Supreme Court cases of the Burger Court
1982 in United States case law